Michel Fontaine (born 26 January 1934) is a French former sports shooter. He competed in the 50 metre rifle, prone event at the 1972 Summer Olympics.

References

1934 births
Living people
French male sport shooters
Olympic shooters of France
Shooters at the 1972 Summer Olympics
Place of birth missing (living people)
20th-century French people